The Selaru languages are a pair of Austronesian languages (geographically Central–Eastern Malayo-Polynesian languages) spoken in the Tanimbar Islands of Indonesia. They are not closely related, being 56% lexically similar (Ethnologue).

These languages are Selaru and Seluwasan.

References

Languages of Indonesia
Central Malayo-Polynesian languages